Stanley Friedman may refer to:

 Stanley M. Friedman (born 1936), deputy mayor of New York City
 Stanley P. Friedman (1925–2006), American author and photographer